The Slug and Lettuce is a Grade II listed public house at 330 Upper Street and Islington Green, Islington, London.

It was built in the mid-late 19th century, and was known as "The Fox" until 1984. It was the first Slug and Lettuce, which is now one of the UK's leading pub chains.

References

Pubs in the London Borough of Islington
Grade II listed pubs in London
19th-century establishments in England
Buildings and structures completed in the 19th century
19th-century architecture in the United Kingdom
Buildings and structures in Islington